

This is a list of cricket umpires who have officiated at least one men's Test match. As of July 2022, 497 umpires have officiated in a Test match. Current members of the current Emirates Elite Panel of ICC Umpires, appointed by the International Cricket Council to officiate in Test matches and One Day Internationals, are shown in bold.  Current members of the Emirates International Panel of ICC Umpires, who may also be called upon to officiate in Test matches in busy cricketing years, are marked with a dagger (†).

In December 2019, in the first match between Australia and New Zealand, Aleem Dar stood in his 129th Test match, breaking the record previously set by Steve Bucknor.

List of umpires

In-game changes
The figures above include the following occasions when an on-field umpire was replaced during a Test, (apart from Amiesh Saheba replacing Billy Doctrove for the 2nd Test between India and Pakistan at Kolkata in 2007, and Rod Tucker replacing Aleem Dar for the 2nd Test between England and Sri Lanka at Chester-le-Street in 2016).

Three umpires were used for the 2nd Test between Australia and New Zealand at Hobart in 2001–02. Steve Davis was injured and was replaced on field by John Smeaton during the third day.
Three umpires were used for the 2nd Test between South Africa and India at Durban in 2006–07. Mark Benson was ill and was replaced on field by Ian Howell during the third day.
Three umpires were used for the 2nd Test between India and Pakistan at Kolkata in 2007–08.  Billy Doctrove was ill and was replaced on field by Amiesh Saheba during the fourth day.
Three umpires were used for the 2nd Test between New Zealand and India at Napier in 2008–09. Billy Doctrove was ill and was replaced on field by Evan Watkin on the third day.
Three umpires were used for the 2nd Test between Australia and West Indies at Adelaide in 2009–10. Mark Benson was ill and was replaced on field by Asad Rauf on the second day.
Three umpires were used for the 2nd Test between West Indies and New Zealand at Port of Spain in 2014. Rod Tucker was ill and was replaced on field by Richard Illingworth on the fourth day.
Three umpires were used for the 2nd Test between England and Sri Lanka at Chester-le-Street in 2016. Aleem Dar was ill and was replaced on field by Rod Tucker on the fourth day.
Three umpires were used for the 4th Test between India and England at Mumbai in 2016–17. Paul Reiffel was injured and was replaced on field by Marais Erasmus on the first day.
Three umpires were used for the 1st Test between India and Sri Lanka at Kolkata in 2017–18. Richard Kettleborough was ill and was replaced on field by Joel Wilson on the third day.
Three umpires were used for the 2nd Test between South Africa and Australia at Port Elizabeth in 2017–18. Chris Gaffaney was ill and was replaced on field by Sundaram Ravi on the second day.

Notes
NB.The umpires for the 1st Test, South Africa v England, 1895–96 are unknown.

References

External links
Cricinfo – Test matches – Most matches as an umpire
Cricinfo – Emirates Elite Panel Umpires and Referees
ICC Match Officials

International cricket umpires
Test cricket umpires
Test umpires
Umpires